A  (plural ) was the captain of a galley in the Venetian navy. It entailed considerable responsibilities for crewing and maintaining a galley as well as great expenses, which made it increasingly the province of the wealthier patricians.

Eligibility and selection
Galleys equipped by the cities subject to Venice were commanded by nobles from these cities, which often led to friction with the Venetian patricians. 

Apart from rare exceptions, patricians were not appointed to the post before their 20th year. In turn, the post of  served as a stepping-stone for higher commands; to be eligible for them, a  had to have actively served at least four years as captain of a galley.

Duties and responsibilities
The appointment typically lasted from 3 to 5 years. In order to recruit a good crew, a  eager to distinguish himself often had to provide bonuses from his own pocket, hoping to be reimbursed by the government later. 

A monthly stipend was provided by the government, but often this could only be claimed at the end of the campaign season, after the galley had returned to its home port to be demobilized. As a result, only the wealthier patricians could afford to become , and sometimes wealthy families were deliberately selected by the government for that purpose, although cases are known where  tried to use the post for their own financial gain, by imposing loans on their crews and pocketing government money while claiming inflated expenses for their ship. Originally, selection for the post could not be refused by the candidate, particularly at wartime, but the exorbitant expenses made it an onerous duty that many tried to avoid. By 1686, refusal to serve was accepted against a fine of 500 Venetian ducats. In 1696, the penalty for refusal during wartime was sharpened further by deprivation of the right to sit in the Great Council for the duration of the conflict. Because the crew represented a considerable investment, captains were sometimes reluctant to risk them in battle; after the defeat at the Battle of the Oinousses Islands in 1695, a special commission considered that reluctance, as well as the scarcity of wages for crews, as the main reasons for the defeat.

Nevertheless, the frequency with which the Venetian Senate issued instructions on the matter points to widespread violation of these regulations in practice.

Footnotes

References

Sources
 
 
 

Military ranks of the Venetian navy
Sea captains